The Hon Edward Townshend, D.D. (25 October 1719 Raynham, Norfolk  - 27 January 1765 Bath) was an Anglican dean in the eighteenth century.

The son of Charles Townshend, 2nd Viscount Townshend he was educated at Eton and Trinity College, Cambridge. He was ordained in 1743. Townshend became Rector of Pulham in 1745; and of Oakley in 1748. He was Deputy Clerk of the Closet from 1746 until his appointment as Dean of Norwich in 1761.

Notes

1719 births
People from Raynham, Norfolk
People educated at Eton College
Alumni of Trinity College, Cambridge
18th-century English Anglican priests
Deans of Norwich
Younger sons of viscounts
1765 deaths